Samoaia is a genus of flies belonging to the family Drosophilidae.

Species:

Samoaia attenuata 
Samoaia comma 
Samoaia hirta 
Samoaia leonensis 
Samoaia mallochi 
Samoaia nuda 
Samoaia ocellaris

References

Drosophilidae